Julian Hart may refer to:

 Julian Deryl Hart (1894–1980), president of Duke University, North Carolina
 Julian Tudor Hart (1927–2018), British doctor